Real Madriz Fútbol Club is a Nicaraguan football team playing at the top level. It is based in Somoto.

History

On 13 April 2021, the club under Honduran coach Hector Medina reached its first Copa Nicaragua and first top tier league final after defeating Deportivo Jalapa 4–3 on penalties after the game ended 1-1 after extra time. 
The Copa Nicaragua final on 21 October 2021 saw Real Madriz lose 3-1 to Deportivo Walter Ferretti, with Roris Espinoza scoring the lone goal on 57 minutes.
However despite almost winning the Copa Nicaragua, the club was relegated from the primera division

Honours
 Segunda División de Nicaragua and predecessors
 Champions (1) : 2013

 Copa de Nicaragua and predecessors
 Runners up (1) : 2021

Rivalries

Clásico de las Segovias 
The club's nearest neighbour is Deportivo Ocotal, with whom the club shares a fierce rivalry.

List of coaches

  Mario José Alfaro Mercado (2001–2003)
  Léonidas Rodríguez (2004)
  Mario José Alfaro Mercado (2005)
  Miguel Ángel Palacios García (2006)
  Leonidas Rodríguez (2006–2007)
  Salvador Dubois Leiva
  Fredall Murillo (2009)
  Sindulio Adolfo Castellanos (2010–April 2012)
  Juan Ramón Trejo (August 2011)
  Ángel Orellana (July 2012– November 2012)
  Omar Zambrana (January 2013 – August 2013)
  Tyrone Acevedo (September 2013)
  Angel Orellana (September 2013 – November 2013)
  Juan Ramón Trejo (December 2013 – February 2014)
  Santiago Irias (Interim) (February 2014– February 2014)
  Luís Eduardo Montaño (March 2014 – June 2014)
  Armando Ricardo Hernandez (June 2014– October 2014)
  Mario Cruz (October 2014– February 2015)
  Leonidas Rodriguez (February 2015- January 2016)
  Elvin Roberto Cerna (January 2016 - April 2016)
  Sindulio Adolfo Castellanos (April 2016 - June 2017)
  Abraham Zavala (June 2017 - August 2017)
  Daniel Bartolotta (August 2017 - October 2017)
  Tyron Acevedo (October 2017 - June 2018)
  Carlos Matamoros (July 2018 -)
  Miguel Ángel Sánchez (2018- December 2018)
  Sindulio Adolfo Castellanos (December 2018 - February 2019)
  Miguel Ángel Sánchez ( - November 2019)
  Carlos Matamoros (November 2019 - December 2019)
  Juan Adriel Ramirez (January 2020 - May 2020)
  Carlos Matamoros (May 2020 - December 2020)
  Ronaldo Alvarado (January 2021 – March 2021)
  Héctor Medina (March 2021 - December 2021)
  Roberto Chanampe (January 2022 - March 2022)
  Miguel Ángel Sánchez (March 2022 - Present)

External links
 Excelente apoyo a los norteños - El Nuevo Diario 
 Historia - Real Madriz 

Football clubs in Nicaragua
Association football clubs established in 1996
1996 establishments in Nicaragua